Šentvid pri Grobelnem ( or ) is a village in the Municipality of Šmarje pri Jelšah in eastern Slovenia. It lies on the regional road from Šmarje to Celje. The area is part of the traditional region of Styria. The municipality is now included in the Savinja Statistical Region.

Name
The name of the settlement was changed from Šent Vid pri Grobelnem to Šentvid pri Grobelnem in 1955.

Church
The local parish church from which the settlement gets its name is dedicated to Saint Vitus and belongs to the Roman Catholic Diocese of Celje. It is a medieval building that was rebuilt in the 17th century and extended and restyled in the 18th century.

References

External links
Šentvid pri Grobelnem at Geopedia

Populated places in the Municipality of Šmarje pri Jelšah